is a former Japanese football player. He played for Japan national team.

Club career
Sawanobori was born in Fujinomiya on January 12, 1970. After graduating from Tokai University, he joined new club Shimizu S-Pulse based in his local Shizuoka Prefecture in 1992. He played as regular player from first season. He was selected J.League Rookie of the Year in 1993. In 1996, the club won J.League Cup. In 1999, the club won the 2nd place in J1 League and he was selected Japanese Footballer of the Year awards. In Asia, the club also won 1999–2000 Asian Cup Winners' Cup. In 2001, the club won Emperor's Cup. He retired in 2005. He played 381 games and scored 85 goals in the league. Sawanobori was immensely popular at S-Pulse, and having spent his entire career at the club he was affectionately known as Mr S-Pulse.

National team career
In April 1993, Sawanobori was selected Japan national team for 1994 World Cup qualification. At this qualification, on April 8, he debuted against Thailand. In 1994, he also played at 1994 Asian Games. In September 1999, he played for Japan for the first time in 5 years. In 2000, he played at 2000 Asian Cup qualification. This qualification was his last game for Japan. He played 16 games and scored 3 goals for Japan until 2000.

Club statistics

National team statistics

International goals

Personal honors
 Japanese Footballer of the Year – 1999
 J.League Best XI – 1999
 J.League Rookie of the Year – 1993

Team honors
Shimizu S-Pulse
 Emperor's Cup – 2001
 J.League Cup – 1996
 Japanese Super Cup – 2001, 2002
 Asian Cup Winners Cup – 2000

See also
List of one-club men

References

External links

Japan National Football Team Database

1970 births
Living people
Tokai University alumni
People from Fujinomiya, Shizuoka
Association football people from Shizuoka Prefecture
Japanese footballers
Japan international footballers
J1 League players
Shimizu S-Pulse players
Association football midfielders
Footballers at the 1994 Asian Games
Asian Games competitors for Japan